Deming Glacier is a tributary glacier flowing along the north side of Novasio Ridge to enter Man-o-War Glacier, in the Admiralty Mountains, Victoria Land. It was mapped by the United States Geological Survey from surveys and U.S. Navy air photos, 1960–63, and was named by the Advisory Committee on Antarctic Names for Ralph A. Deming, U.S. Navy, Squadron VX-6 Aviation Electrician at McMurdo Station, 1967.

See also
 List of glaciers in the Antarctic
 Glaciology

References

Glaciers of Borchgrevink Coast